Eoophyla latifascia is a moth in the family Crambidae. It was described by Eugene G. Munroe in 1959. It is found in Papua, Indonesia.

References

Eoophyla
Moths described in 1959